Modern Healthcare is a twice monthly business publication targeting executives in the healthcare industry.  It is an independent American publisher of national and regional healthcare news.

The publication is also known for providing statistical rankings, competitive insight, and practical information on topics such as information technology, federal and state legislation, Medicare/Medicaid, finance, access to capital, reimbursement, investing, supply chain, materials management, strategic planning, governance, managed care, insurers, EHRs, patient safety, quality, outpatient care, rural health, construction, staffing, legal affairs and international healthcare.

Modern Healthcare organizes several annual events, including its Health Care Hall of Fame awards dinner, and its 100 Most Powerful People in Healthcare list.

Publication history 
Modern Healthcare was established in 1976, and is based in Chicago, Illinois. Modern Healthcare is owned and published by Detroit-based Crain Communications Inc.

References

External links
 

1976 establishments in Illinois
Business magazines published in the United States
Weekly magazines published in the United States
Health magazines
Healthcare in the United States
Magazines established in 1976
Magazines published in Chicago